The Game is the eighth studio album by the British rock band Queen. It was released on 30 June 1980 by EMI Records in the UK and by Elektra Records in the US. The Game features a different sound from its predecessor, Jazz (1978). The Game was the first Queen album to use a synthesizer (an Oberheim OB-X). 

A critical and commercial success, The Game became the only Queen album to reach No. 1 in the US, and also became their best-selling studio album in the US, with four million copies sold to date, tying with the sales for News of the World. Notable songs on the album include the bass-driven "Another One Bites the Dust" and the rock and roll "Crazy Little Thing Called Love", both of which reached No. 1 in the US. Reissued in May 2003 on DVD-Audio with Dolby 5.1 surround sound and DTS 5.1. The 5.1 mix of "Coming Soon" features an alternate backing track, as the final master tapes could not be found when mixing the album to 5.1.

Songs

Side one

"Play the Game"

"Play the Game" was written by Freddie Mercury. The song was released as a single in 1980, reaching No. 14 in the UK and No. 42 in the US. The song was performed live from 1980 to 1982.

"Dragon Attack"
"Dragon Attack" was written by Brian May. The song was a live favourite being performed from 1980 to 1985. On the UK release of "Another One Bites The Dust", it was featured as the B-side. Two remixes of the track were scheduled to feature on the cancelled BASIC Queen Bootlegs 1992 album.  The first by Jack Benson and R.A.K. featured as a bonus track on 1991 reissues of The Game.  The second was an instrumental remix by Dave Ogilvie. Stylistically, Dragon Attack is a funk rock song.

"Another One Bites the Dust"

"Another One Bites the Dust" was written by John Deacon. The song is known as a funk song and was released as a single at the suggestion of American singer Michael Jackson, who was a huge fan of the group and would often see them in concert when they came to Los Angeles. "Another One Bites the Dust" was a worldwide success reaching No. 1 in America and many other countries and in the UK it reached No. 7. After the success of the song, Queen recorded Hot Space, which was a more disco album. It is credited as Queen's best selling single, having sold 7 million copies worldwide. The song was played live from 1980 until the last tour with Mercury in 1986. Part of this song was performed during Queen medley songs by Extreme on The Freddie Mercury Tribute Concert in 1992.

"Need Your Loving Tonight"

"Need Your Loving Tonight" was written by Deacon. The song was released as a single in November 1980 and reached number 44 in the United States. The song was also played frequently during The Game Tour in 1980 and then less frequently in 1981, but was not played live thereafter.

"Crazy Little Thing Called Love"

"Crazy Little Thing Called Love" was written by Mercury while lounging in a bubble bath in the Bayerischer Hof Hotel in Munich, where Queen were staying during the making of The Game. In addition to playing guitar on the record, Mercury also played guitar in concert. The song peaked at No. 2 in the UK and No. 1 in the Billboard Hot 100 in the United States for four consecutive weeks. "Crazy Little Thing Called Love" also peaked at No. 1 in Australia, Canada, Mexico and Netherlands. The song has been covered by many artists. "Crazy Little Thing Called Love" and "Another One Bites The Dust" were Queen's only No. 1 singles in the United States.

Side two

"Rock It (Prime Jive)"
"Rock It (Prime Jive)" was written by Roger Taylor. The song begins with Mercury singing the intro and then Taylor sings the rest of the song. The song was only performed live in North and South America, and in Japan, during The Game and Hot Space Tours respectively.

"Don't Try Suicide"
"Don't Try Suicide" was written by Mercury, and is Mercury's third and final song on the album. The song has never been performed live. The song was the B-side on the American release of "Another One Bites the Dust".  In 1992, DJ Muggs remixed the track for inclusion on the later cancelled BASIC Queen Bootlegs compilation.

"Sail Away Sweet Sister"
"Sail Away Sweet Sister (To the Sister I Never Had)" was written by May and features him on lead vocals. The bridge was sung by Mercury. The song was recorded in June/July 1979. It has never been performed live by Queen, but has been by Guns N' Roses and by Brian May himself during the Another world tour in 1998.  The song was sampled by Das EFX on their 1998 track "Change" from the album Generation EFX.

The song has also been on compilation albums Deep Cuts, Volume 2 (1977-1982) and Queen Forever.

"Coming Soon"
"Coming Soon" was written by Taylor. Mercury and Taylor share lead vocals. The song had been started during the Jazz sessions.

"Save Me"

"Save Me" was written by May, in tribute to a friend whose marriage had recently ended. May played most of the instruments on the track including acoustic and electric guitars, piano and synthesizer. The song was performed live from 1979 to 1982. When live the song features a short piano entrance absent from the studio version. The song peaked at No. 11 in the UK Singles Chart.

Artwork
The photo on the cover of the EMI CD is different from that originally used on the LP and cassette release, even though the Hollywood CD still has the original photo. The original photo (with Roger Taylor having folded arms and Brian May not having a hand resting upon his exposed hip) is shown in the article. This alternate photo was also used on the cover of the album in the Crown Jewels box set released in 1998, and on the DTS DVD-Audio edition of the album released in 2003.

Tour

Reception

Record Mirror wrote in a contemporary review, "After Zeppelin and even before the Scorpions, Queen are the most exciting band I've ever seen or heard. And I'm sure all you lovers of quality music will agree." Rolling Stone felt that it was "nice to hear a Queen album with songs, not 'anthems'," but opined that "these guys know how this music should sound and feel, but they can't bend enough to get with it." The Washington Post gave a scathing review, writing: "After five years of unchallenging, dismal albums, this was supposed to be Queen's comeback. But no such luck." Steve Taylor, writing for Smash Hits, was equally as dismissive, writing "sandwiched between two slabs of Queen's usual symphonic and/or choral pomp-rock [...] lies a filling of utterly unoriginal corn".

Creem readers voted The Game the seventh greatest album of 1980. At the Grammy Awards in 1981, Queen and Mack were nominated for Producer of the Year (Non-Classical) while "Another One Bites the Dust" was nominated for Best Rock Performance by a Duo or Group with Vocal. Queen received an American Music Award nomination for Favorite Pop/Rock Band/Duo/Group, while "Another One Bites the Dust" received the award for Favorite Pop/Rock Single.

In a retrospective review, AllMusic's Stephen Thomas Erlewine said that the album's "disco rock blends" showed a band that has "turned away from rock and toward pop", "turning decidedly, decisively pop, and it's a grand, state-of-the-art circa 1980 pop album that still stands as one of the band's most enjoyable records." AllMusic would go on to name The Game as Queen's best album of the 1980s. Evan Sawdey of PopMatters called The Game a "regular ol' rock album". In 2008, Out ranked the album number 28 of 100 in a poll of "more than 100 actors, comedians, musicians, writers, critics, performance artists, label reps, and DJs, asking each to list the ten albums that left the most indelible impressions on their lives."

Band appraisal

Track listing
All lead vocals by Freddie Mercury unless noted.

Personnel
Queen
Freddie Mercury – lead vocals , co-lead vocals , backing vocals , piano , synthesizer , acoustic guitar 
Brian May – electric guitar , backing vocals , acoustic guitar , synthesizer , piano , lead vocals 
Roger Taylor – drums , backing vocals , electric guitar , synthesizer , lead vocals , co-lead vocals , percussion
John Deacon – bass guitar , electric guitar , acoustic guitar , piano , percussion 

Additional musician
Reinhold Mack – synthesizer

Charts

Weekly charts

Year-end charts

Certifications and sales

References

External links
Queen official website: Discography: The Game: includes lyrics of all non-bonus tracks except "Another One Bites the Dust".

1980 albums
Albums produced by Reinhold Mack
Elektra Records albums
EMI Records albums
Hollywood Records albums
Parlophone albums
Queen (band) albums